Mitooma District is a district in Western Uganda. It is named after its main municipal, administrative and commercial center, Mitooma.

Location
Mitooma District is bordered by Bushenyi District to the north, Sheema District to the east, Ntungamo District to the south, and Rukungiri District to the west. The coordinates of the district are:00 36S, 30 00E.

Overview
The district was created by Act of Parliament and became functional on 1 July 2010. Prior to then, the district used to be Ruhinda County in Bushenyi District. Mitooma district is part of Ankole sub-region. The sub-region, which is coterminous with the Ankole Kingdom, comprises the following districts: 1. Buhweju District 2. Bushenyi District 3. Ibanda District 4. Isingiro District 5. Kiruhura District 6. Mitooma District 7. Ntungamo District 8. Rubirizi District and 9. Sheema District. The sub-region was home to an estimated 2.2 million people as of 2002, according to the national census conducted that year.

Population
In 1991, the national population census estimated the district population at about 134,300. In 2002, the national census estimated the population of the district at about 160,800. In 2012, the population of Mitooma District was estimated at approximately 196,300.

Prominent people
 Ambassador Najuna-Njuneki – Politician and Diplomat. He is currently the Ambassador in charge of Special Duties in the Ministry of Foreign Affairs. Focal Point for Commercial And Economic Diplomacy.
 Major General Kahinda Otafiire – Minister of Justice & Constitutional Affairs in the Ugandan Cabinet. And Bikwasi Haruna Rwamutakitwe A businessman from Kirembe Nyihanda Mitooma Ruhinda A son of Late DR Abu Bikwasi from Kayanga village in Mitooma District
 Juliet Bashiisha Agasha – Member of Parliament

Schools

Tertiary Schools
Kabira Technical Institute

Secondary and High School
Ruhinda Senior Secondary School
Kyeibare Girls Secondary School
St. Noah Secondary School, Mutara
Ijumo Progressive Secondary School
Kigarama Secondary School, Bitereko.
Bubangizi Senior Secondary School, Kashenshero.
Kashenshero Girls Secondary School
Kashenshero vocational school
Kanyabwanga Secondary School

See also

References

External links
  Mitooma District Information Portal
  Satellite Map of Mitooma District at Maplandia.com

 
Districts of Uganda
Western Region, Uganda